Alfred Waldemar Garmann Larsen (24 November 1863 – 10 September 1950) was a Norwegian businessman and sailor who competed in the 1912 Summer Olympics. He was a crew member of the Norwegian boat Magda IX, which won the gold medal in the 12 metre class.

Business career 
Larsen took over a family company which became one of Norway's leading importers of wines and liquors. He was decorated Knight of the Order of St. Olav in 1912.

References

External links
databaseolympics.com profile

1863 births
1950 deaths
Norwegian male sailors (sport)
Sailors at the 1912 Summer Olympics – 12 Metre
Olympic sailors of Norway
Olympic gold medalists for Norway
Olympic medalists in sailing
Medalists at the 1912 Summer Olympics
Norwegian businesspeople